To Have or Not to Have (Dashtan Va Nadashtan) is a 2001 Iranian documentary film. It was the debut writing and directorial effort of Niki Karimi.

See also
Niki Karimi
Abbas Kiarostami
Cinema of Iran

External links
Review

2001 films
Iranian drama films
Films directed by Niki Karimi
2001 drama films
2000s Persian-language films
2001 directorial debut films